Brett Goldstein (born 17 July 1980) is a British actor, comedian, podcaster, and writer. Known for his role as Roy Kent in the Apple TV+ sports comedy series Ted Lasso, Goldstein received the Primetime Emmy Award for Outstanding Supporting Actor in a Comedy Series for each of the first two seasons.

Early life 
Goldstein was born in Sutton, London, to a British Jewish family, on 17 July 1980. He attended Sevenoaks School, one of the oldest and most expensive independent schools in the UK. After leaving school he attended the University of Warwick, graduating with a degree in Film Studies.

Soon afterward, Goldstein briefly relocated to Marbella, Spain, to work at a strip club which his father purchased during a "midlife crisis". He then went to New York to study acting at the American Academy of Dramatic Arts. While there, he began writing scripts that he would later take to the Edinburgh Fringe Festival. For example, he turned his Marbella experience into a stand-up comedy show called Brett Goldstein Grew Up in a Strip Club (2011).

Career 
Goldstein began acting in short films and had his first feature film role in the self-written thriller Wish You Were Here (2005), which was later remade as Slave (2009). In 2009, he made his television debut in two episodes of ITV's long-running police drama The Bill. From 2012 to 2016, he appeared in several comedy series, such as BBC One's Uncle, E4's Drifters and Channel 4's Derek, starring, written and directed by Ricky Gervais. He also played American TV legend David Hasselhoff's personal trainer, Danny, in Dave's mockumentary series Hoff the Record (2015–2016).

In 2013, Goldstein wrote and played the leading role of a Peckham postman-turned-superhero in the low-budget romantic comedy SuperBob (2015). At the end of filming, comedian Catherine Tate, who starred in the film as his character's boss at the Ministry of Defence, invited him to co-write the BBC One sitcom Catherine Tate's Nan (2014–2015), a spin-off of The Catherine Tate Show about her popular sweary old-lady character Joanie Taylor. The two continued to collaborate, with Goldstein joining Tate on her first ever live tour in 2016 and later co-writing the feature film The Nan Movie (2022).

In 2016, he won the BIFA Award for Best Supporting Actor for his role as Brendan in the comedy film Adult Life Skills, starring Jodie Whittaker as the lead character. Two years later, he again appeared alongside Whittaker in the BBC's long-running science fiction drama Doctor Who, in an episode called "The Tsuranga Conundrum" (2018). Later that year, in July 2018, he began his career as a podcaster with Films to Be Buried With, a comedy podcast featuring guests talking about films that have been important in their lives. Goldstein has also written and performed four solo stand-up shows.

TV producer Bill Lawrence hired Goldstein as a writer for the 2020 Apple TV+ show Ted Lasso, starring Jason Sudeikis. His writing on the show led to him being cast as the character of aging footballer Roy Kent. Rolling Stone's Emily Zemler stated that Goldstein "felt such a kinship with this stoic tough guy, in fact, that he emailed a self-taped audition of five scenes to the production team. The tapes, which included the 'If I don't hear silence I'm gonna start punching dicks' scene from the pilot, ended up scoring him the role. The rest is history." He later won two Primetime Emmy Awards for Outstanding Supporting Actor in a Comedy Series two years in a row, in 2021 and 2022, for his work on the show.

Together with Black Mirror writer Will Bridges, Goldstein created and wrote the six-part science fiction anthology series Soulmates for AMC, based on their short film For Life (2013). The series premiered in October 2020 and starred Sarah Snook, Malin Akerman, Betsy Brandt and Charlie Heaton. In 2022, he signed a multi-year overall deal with Warner Bros. Television. Later that year, Goldstein appeared as Hercules in the mid-credits scene of Thor: Love and Thunder and is expected to play the character in future Marvel Cinematic Universe properties.

Filmography

Film

Television

Theatre and stand-up shows

Radio and podcast

Awards and nominations

References

External links 

1980 births
21st-century British male actors
Alumni of the University of Warwick
British Jews
British male film actors
British male television actors
British male voice actors
British people of Jewish descent
British stand-up comedians
Jewish British male actors
Living people
Outstanding Performance by a Lead Actor in a Comedy Series Primetime Emmy Award winners